The 1998 Junior World Boxing Championships were held in Buenos Aires, Argentina, from November 6 to November 16, 1998. It was the tenth edition of the Junior World Boxing Championships. The competition is under the supervision of the world's governing body for amateur boxing  AIBA and is the junior version of the World Amateur Boxing Championships.

Medal winners

 After championships Israel Hector Perez (57 kg) was disqualified

Medal table

See also
 World Amateur Boxing Championships

References
http://amateur-boxing.strefa.pl/Championships/WorldJuniorChamps1998.html

Youth World Amateur Boxing Championships
Youth, 1998
 Sports competitions in Buenos Aires
International boxing competitions hosted by Argentina
1998 in Argentine sport